William Force Stead (29 August 1884 – 8 March 1967) was an American diplomat and poet. He became an Anglican clergyman, and chaplain of Worcester College, Oxford, from 1927 to 1930. He is best known for his editorial work on Christopher Smart.

Biography
Stead was born in Washington, D.C. and educated at the University of Virginia. He left the U.S. consular service around 1917 and was a student at Queen's College, Oxford, publishing verses in Oxford poetry. He was ordained and spent time in Italy, before returning to Oxford and Worcester College as a Fellow.

Stead was a friend of T. S. Eliot, and close to him at the time of his 1927 religious conversion, baptising him in the Church of England. He returned to an academic position in the US in 1939, and died in Baltimore.

Works
Moonflowers (1909)
Windflowers (1911)
Holy Innocents (1917)
Verd Antique (1920)
The Sweet Miracle (1922)
Wayfaring (1924)
Uriel: A Hymn in Praise of Divine Immanence (1933)
The Poetry of the Bible (1938) editor
Rejoice in the Lamb: a song from Bedlam by Christopher Smart (1939) editor

See also

Peter Force

Notes

External links 

 William Force Stead Papers. James Marshall and Marie-Louise Osborn Collection, Beinecke Rare Book and Manuscript Library, Yale University.
 

1884 births
1967 deaths
20th-century American poets
Anglican poets
Fellows of Worcester College, Oxford
Alumni of The Queen's College, Oxford
University of Virginia alumni